New Mexico State Road 104 (also termed State Highway 104 or NM 104) is a  state highway in the U.S. state of New Mexico. The route travels through San Miguel and Quay counties, and through the communities of Las Vegas, Alta Vista, Trementina, Garita, and Tucumcari.

Route description

History

Major intersections

See also

 List of state roads in New Mexico

References

External links

104
Transportation in San Miguel County, New Mexico
Transportation in Quay County, New Mexico
Las Vegas, New Mexico
Tucumcari, New Mexico